Zhang Yuxi  (born 29th January 1993) also known as Yci, is a Chinese actress. She is known for her roles as Lin Xingchen in the romance comedy drama My Little Princess (2016) and Chu Linglong in Love and Redemption (2020).

Career
In 2009, Zhang won the championship in the Rayli Kanebo Beauty Competition.

In 2013, Zhang made her acting debut in the historical drama Man Comes to Tang Dynasty . She then starred in the wuxia film The Taking of Tiger Mountain and youth romance film Forever Young.

In 2016, Zhang became known for her role in the romance comedy drama My Little Princess; and its sequel Dear Prince. Zhang then starred in both installments of the fantasy romance drama I Cannot Hug You  and received increased recognition.

In 2018, Zhang made a brief appearance in the historical palace drama Ruyi's Royal Love in the Palace, portraying a famed courtesan.

In 2019, Zhang starred in the period suspense drama Please Give Me a Pair of Wings. She was cast in the fantasy romance film White Fish Girl, part of the Liao Zhai film series produced by Dongfang Feiyun.

In 2020, Zhang starred in the romance drama Intense Love as the female lead. The same year, she starred in the xianxia romance drama Love and Redemption. 
 
In 2021, Zhang starred in drama Stand By Me

Filmography

Film

Television series

Variety show - TV Show

Theater
Zhi Yin Dan Sheng Zai Yi Qi (只因单身在一起)

Discography

Business 
Since 2017, she started to set up her own stores and business brands. Initially, all the brands used the same name Eifair Lab to produce many products, then split up.

 Bedding shop Yci La Maision]
 Brand - fashion store StyleNotes: 
 Cosmetic brand EGOCI

Awards and nominations

References

External links
 
 
 
Yci on Kwai
Yci Xiao Hong Shu
Yci TikTok Cn/ Douyin
Yci  Oasis

1991 births
Living people
People from Yanbian
Actresses from Jilin
21st-century Chinese actresses
Chinese television actresses
Chinese film actresses